The name Dalila, or earlier Dalilia, has been used for seven tropical cyclones in the Eastern Pacific Ocean.

 Tropical Storm Dalilia (1983), never affected land
 Hurricane Dalilia (1989), passed just south of the Hawaiian Islands
 Tropical Storm Dalila (1995), did not make landfall
 Hurricane Dalila (2001), passed directly over Socorro Island as a tropical storm
 Tropical Storm Dalila (2007), passed over Socorro Island
 Hurricane Dalila (2013), made some impact on the western shore of Mexico and then shifted westward out to sea
 Tropical Storm Dalila (2019), never threatened land 

Pacific hurricane set index articles